A Royal Romance is a 1930 American Pre-Code romantic comedy film directed by Erle C. Kenton and starring William Collier, Pauline Starke and Clarence Muse. It was an unofficial remake of the 1925 silent film A Fool and His Money.

Cast
 William Collier as John Hale  
 Pauline Starke as Countess von Baden  
 Clarence Muse as Rusty 
 Ann Brody as Frau Muller  
 Eugenie Besserer as Mother  
 Walter P. Lewis as Hans  
 Betty Boyd as Mitzi  
 Ullrich Haupt as Count von Baden  
 Bert Sprotte as Magistrate  
 Dorothy DeBorba as Gloria

References

Bibliography
 Parish, James Robert. Ghosts and angels in Hollywood films: plots, critiques, casts, and credits for 264 theatrical and made-for-television releases. McFarland, 1994.

External links
 

1930 films
1930 romantic comedy films
American romantic comedy films
Films directed by Erle C. Kenton
Films set in Europe
Columbia Pictures films
American black-and-white films
1930s English-language films
1930s American films